DNA ligase (NAD+) (polydeoxyribonucleotide synthase (NAD+), polynucleotide ligase (NAD+), DNA repair enzyme, DNA joinase, polynucleotide synthetase (nicotinamide adenine dinucleotide), deoxyribonucleic-joining enzyme, deoxyribonucleic ligase, deoxyribonucleic repair enzyme, deoxyribonucleic joinase, DNA ligase, deoxyribonucleate ligase, polynucleotide ligase, deoxyribonucleic acid ligase, polynucleotide synthetase, deoxyribonucleic acid joinase, DNA-joining enzyme, polynucleotide ligase (nicotinamide adenine dinucleotide)) is an enzyme with systematic name poly(deoxyribonucleotide):poly(deoxyribonucleotide) ligase (AMP-forming, NMN-forming). This enzyme catalyses the following chemical reaction

 NAD+ + (deoxyribonucleotide)n + (deoxyribonucleotide)m  AMP + beta-nicotinamide D-ribonucleotide + (deoxyribonucleotide)n+m

Catalyses the formation of a phosphodiester at the site of a single-strand break in duplex DNA.

See also 
 DNA ligase

References

External links 
 

EC 6.5.1